California's 5th district may refer to:

 California's 5th congressional district
 California's 5th State Assembly district
 California's 5th State Senate district